Toufik Zeghdane (born September 17, 1992) is an Algerian footballer who plays as a left-back for CA Bordj Bou Arréridj.

Honours

Club
 MC Alger
 Algerian Cup (2): 2014, 2016
 Algerian Super Cup (1): 2014

 USM Alger
 Algerian Super Cup (1): 2016

References

Living people
1992 births
Algerian footballers
CS Sedan Ardennes players
USM Alger players
MC Alger players
Association football defenders
Sportspeople from Ardennes (department)
Algerian Ligue Professionnelle 1 players
21st-century Algerian people
Footballers from Grand Est
French footballers
French sportspeople of Algerian descent
Championnat National 2 players
Ligue 2 players